Solo 2.0 is the first studio album by Italian singer Marco Mengoni, released by Sony Music Italy on 27 September 2011. 
After debuting at number one on the Italian Albums Chart, the album was certified gold by the Federation of the Italian Music Industry, for domestic sales exceeding 30,000 units.

Singles
The first single from the album, "Solo (Vuelta al ruedo)" was released as a digital download on 1 September 2011, and it was released to mainstream radios on 2 September 2011. The song debuted and peaked at number four on the Italian Singles Chart. The music video for the song, directed by Gianluca "Calu" Montesano, was premiered by MSN Video on 7 September 2011.

"Tanto il resto cambia" was released as the second single from the album on 21 October 2011. The music video for the song was directed by Saku.

On 27 January 2012, "Dall'inferno" was released to mainstream radios as the third single from the album. The music video for the song, directed by Gianluca "Calu" Montesano, was released in March 2012.

Track listing

Charts

Weekly charts

Year-end charts

Certifications

Notes

Marco Mengoni albums
Italian-language albums